Joko Widodo (born 21 June 1961), popularly known as Jokowi, is an Indonesian politician and businessman who is the 7th and current president of Indonesia. A member of the Indonesian Democratic Party of Struggle (PDI-P), he was the country's first president to not have emerged from the country’s political or military elite. He previously served as governor of Jakarta from 2012 to 2014 and mayor of Surakarta from 2005 to 2012.

Jokowi was born and raised in a riverside slum in Surakarta. He graduated from Gadjah Mada University in 1985, and married his wife, Iriana, a year later. He worked as a carpenter and a furniture exporter before being elected mayor of Surakarta in 2005. He achieved national prominence as mayor and was elected governor of Jakarta in 2012, with Basuki Tjahaja Purnama as his deputy. As governor, he reinvigorated local politics, introduced publicised blusukan visits (unannounced spot checks) and improved the city's bureaucracy, reducing corruption in the process. He also introduced years-late programs to improve quality of life, including universal healthcare, dredged the city's main river to reduce flooding, and inaugurated the construction of the city's subway system.

In 2014, he was nominated as the PDI-P's candidate in that year's presidential election, choosing Jusuf Kalla as his running mate. Jokowi was elected over his opponent Prabowo Subianto, who disputed the outcome of the election, and was inaugurated on 20 October 2014. Since taking office, Jokowi has focused on economic growth and infrastructure development as well as an ambitious health and education agenda. On foreign policy, his administration has emphasised "protecting Indonesia’s sovereignty", with the sinking of illegal foreign fishing vessels and the prioritising and scheduling  of capital punishment for drug smugglers. The latter was despite intense representations and diplomatic protests from foreign powers, including Australia and France. He was re-elected in 2019 for a second five-year term, again defeating Prabowo Subianto.

Early life 
Jokowi was born Mulyono on 21 June 1961 in Surakarta, and is of Javanese descent. He is the eldest of four siblings and is the only son of Noto Mihardjo (father) and Sudjiatmi Notomihardjo (mother). He has three younger sisters, named Iit Sriyantini, Ida Yati, and Titik Relawati. His father came from Karanganyar, while his grandparents came from a village in Boyolali. Jokowi was often sick as a toddler, and his name was thus changed—a common practice in Javanese culture—to Joko Widodo, with widodo meaning "healthy" in Javanese. At the age of 12, he started working in his father's furniture workshop. Throughout his childhood, Jokowi's family constantly faced evictions from their landlords; this greatly affected him, and later in his career organised medical housing in Surakarta during his years as mayor of the city.

Jokowi's education began at State Elementary School 111 Tirtoyoso, known for being a school for less wealthy citizens. He continued his studies in State Junior High School 1 Surakarta, and later wanted to attend State Senior High School 1 Surakarta, but failed the entrance exam and enrolled in State Senior High School 6 Surakarta.

Business career 
After graduating from university, Jokowi began work at PT Kertas Kraft Aceh (id), a state-owned firm in Aceh, Sumatra. He worked in the present-day Bener Meriah Regency between 1986 and 1988 as a supervisor of forestry and raw materials of a Pinus merkusii plantation.

However, Jokowi soon became uninterested in his activities in the firm and returned home. He began working in his grandfather's furniture factory for a year before establishing his own company, Rakabu, whose namesake is his first child. The company, which mainly focused on teak furniture, nearly went bankrupt at one point but survived following an IDR 500 million loan from Perusahaan Gas Negara. By 1991, the company began exporting its products, and they were successful in international markets. The firm first established a presence in the European market in France, and it was a French customer named Bernard who gave Joko Widodo the nickname "Jokowi".

By 2002, Jokowi had become the chairman of Surakarta's furniture manufacturers association. Ultimately he decided to become a politician and promote reform in his home town, Surakarta, after seeing the neat layouts of some European cities while promoting his furniture there. After becoming mayor, he also made a joint venture with politician and former lieutenant general Luhut Binsar Pandjaitan, when the two founded PT Rakabu Sejahtera (from Rakabu and Luhut's PT Toba Sejahtera).

In 2018, Jokowi reported his net worth to be Rp 50.25 billion (US$3.5 million), mostly in the form of property holdings in Central Java and Jakarta.

Political career

Mayor of Surakarta 

After first joining PDI-P in 2004, Jokowi ran in the mayoral race in Surakarta in 2005 with F. X. Hadi Rudyatmo as his running mate, with the support of PDI-P and the National Awakening Party. The pair won 36.62% of the vote against the incumbent Slamet Suryanto and two other candidates. During the campaign, many questioned his background as a property and furniture businessman. However, one academic paper claimed his leadership style was successful because it established an interactive relationship with the people, through which he was able to induce people's strong faith in him. He adopted the development framework of European cities (which he frequently travelled to as a businessman) as a guide for changes in Surakarta.

His notable policies as mayor include building new traditional markets and renovating existing markets, constructing a 7-km city walk with a 3-meter wide pedestrian walkway along Surakarta's main street, revitalising the Balekambang and Sriwedari parks, employing stricter regulations on cutting down trees along the city's main streets, rebranding the city as a centre of Javanese culture and tourism under the tagline "The Spirit of Java", promoting the city as a centre for meetings, incentives, conventions and exhibitions (MICE), launching healthcare and education insurance program for all residents, a local bus rapid transit system named Batik Solo Trans and a Solo Techno Park, which helped support the Esemka Indonesian car project.

It was during his tenure as mayor that he conducted the blusukan, an impromptu visit to specific areas to listen to people's issues, which proved popular later in his political career. He also prohibited his family members from bidding for city projects, therefore suppressing the risk of corruption. His policies brought him into conflict with then provincial governor Bibit Waluyo, who on one occasion called Jokowi a "fool" for the latter's opposition to a provincial construction project in Surakarta.

His supporters pointed to rapid positive changes in Surakarta under his leadership and the city's branding with the motto 'Solo: The Spirit of Java'. While in office, he successfully relocated antique stalls in the Banjarsari Gardens without incident, a helpful move in revitalising the functions of the open green land; he emphasised the importance of business firms engaging in community activities; he improved communications with the local community by appearing regularly on local television. As a follow-up of the city's new branding, he applied for Surakarta to become a member of the Organization of World Heritage Cities, which was approved in 2006, and subsequently had the city chosen to host the organisation's conference in October 2008.

In 2007, Surakarta had also hosted the World Music Festival (Festival Musik Dunia/FMD), held at the complex of Fort Vastenburg near the centre of the city. The following year, it was held in the Mangkunegaran Palace Complex.

Part of Jokowi style was his populist 'can-do' (punya gaye) elements designed to build bonds with the broad electorate. As mayor, he became personally involved in an incident just before Christmas 2011 when the Surakarta municipality had overdue bills of close to $1 million (IDR 8.9 billion) owed to the state-owned electricity company Perusahaan Listrik Negara (PLN).

Following its policy of pursuing a more disciplined approach to collecting overdue bills, it imposed a blackout on street lights in the city just before Christmas. The city government quickly authorised payment, but in settling the bill, protested that the PLN should consider the public interest before taking such action. To reinforce the point, Jokowi made a highly publicised personal visit to the local PLN office to deliver the IDR 8.9 billion in cash in the form of hundreds of bundles of notes and even small coins.

In 2010, he was re-elected for a second term, again running with Hadi. They won 90.09% of the vote, losing in only a single polling station. He was later chosen as the 'Tempo Leader of Choice' by Tempo news magazine (2008) and received a 'Changemakers Award' from Republika newspaper (2010); his name also started being considered in national polls for the governorship of Jakarta, long before PDI-P's nomination, including those by University of Indonesia and Cyrus Network (2011).

In 2012, Jokowi faced a smear campaign after declaring his intention to run for the governorship of Jakarta. A group calling itself Save Solo, Save Jakarta and Save Indonesia Team (TS3) reported him to the Corruption Eradication Commission (KPK) for allegedly having facilitated misuse of education funds by his subordinates in Surakarta in 2010. The KPK investigated the allegation, found it was based on false data and said there was no indication Jokowi had misappropriated funds.

Governor of Jakarta 

Despite disappointment from some Surakarta residents that he would not complete his second term as mayor, Jokowi ran in the 2012 Jakarta gubernatorial election and defeated the incumbent Fauzi Bowo in a runoff round. His inner circle of advisers in Jakarta reportedly included people such as FX Hadi 'Rudy' Rudyatmo, Sumartono Hadinoto and Anggit Nugroho, who were colleagues while he was mayor of Surakarta, as well as Basuki Tjahaja Purnama ("Ahok"), his deputy as governor of Jakarta. Jokowi continued the blusukan practice he had adopted as mayor of Surakarta by regularly visiting population centers, especially slums. During these visits, he wore simple, informal clothes and stopped at markets or walked along narrow Jakarta alleys to listen and witness firsthand issues addressed by residents, such as the price of food, housing difficulties, flooding, and transportation. Polling and media coverage suggested that his hands-on style proved very popular both in Jakarta and elsewhere across Indonesia.

After taking office, taxes and Jakarta's provincial budget increased significantly from IDR 41 trillion in 2012 to IDR 72 trillion in 2014. Both Jokowi and Ahok publicised their monthly salary and the provincial budget. They also initiated programs aimed towards transparency, such as online taxes, e-budgeting, e-purchasing, and a cash management system. Moreover, all meetings and activities that Jokowi and Ahok attended were recorded and uploaded on YouTube.

In healthcare, Jokowi introduced a universal health care program, the 'Healthy Jakarta Card' (Kartu Jakarta Sehat, KJS). It involved an insurance program provided through state-owned insurance company PT Askes Indonesia (Persero) and a plan to regulate health charges for treatment for over 20,000 services and procedures. The program was criticised for confusion over details of the implementation and long queues, though Jokowi defended it and counselled patience. In education, Jokowi launched the 'Smart Jakarta Card' (Kartu Jakarta Pintar, KJP) on 1 December 2012 to help needy students. It gives an allowance that can be withdrawn from ATMs for buying school needs such as books and uniforms.

His administration's other notable policies include a system of bureaucratic recruitment called lelang jabatan (literally 'auction of office position'), giving every civil servant the same opportunity to achieve a certain position by fulfilling the required qualifications, regulation of the chaotic agglomeration of street vendors in Pasar Minggu and Pasar Tanah Abang, the dredging and reservoir normalisation projects to reduce flooding, and the inauguration of long-delayed Jakarta MRT and Jakarta LRT. As governor, Jokowi also appointed a non-Muslim 'lurah' (subdistrict chief) for the Muslim-majority subdistrict of Lenteng Agung despite protests by some residents. Former deputy governor Prijanto claimed that Jokowi had carried out maladministration when abusing government certificate asset of BMW Park by formalising another expired certificate.

In 2013, Jokowi was reported to the National Commission on Human Rights over the eviction of the squatters near Pluit. In previous "political contracts", he had vowed not to evict residents to distant locations. Jokowi met with Pluit residents and Komnas HAM to explain the evictions were necessary for restoring water catchment to reduce flooding and that families were being relocated to low-cost apartments.

Presidential candidacies

2014 

Megawati Sukarnoputri nominated Jokowi to be the presidential candidate of her party. During the campaign, a social media volunteer team, JASMEV, once made a provocative statement by threatening that Islam would not be given a space in Indonesia if Jokowi won the 2014 election. The group was paid IDR 500 million to campaign for the Joko Widodo-Jusuf Kalla ticket during the 2014 election.

Following the release of Quick Count results from many different polls, Jokowi declared victory on 9 July. However, his opponent Prabowo also declared victory, creating confusion among the population. On 22 July, hours before the announcement of the election results, Prabowo withdrew. Jokowi's victory was expected and realised hours later. The General Elections Commission (KPU) gave him a close victory with 53.15% of the vote (almost 71 million votes), to Prabowo's 46.85% (62 million votes), though Prabowo's camp disputed these totals.

After his victory, Jokowi stated that growing up under the authoritarian and corrupt New Order regime, he would have never expected someone with a lower-class background to become president. The New York Times reported him as saying, "now, it's quite similar to America, yeah? There is the American dream, and here we have the Indonesian dream". Jokowi was the first Indonesian president outside the military or the political elite, and the political commentator Salim Said gave the popular view of the politician as "someone who is our neighbour, who decided to get into politics and run for president".

2019 

In 2018, Jokowi announced that he would run for re-election next year. His vice president Jusuf Kalla was not eligible for another term because of the term limits set for president and vice president. Kalla had already served a five-year term as vice president during Susilo Bambang Yudhoyono's first term (2004–2009). Speculation surrounding Jokowi's choice of running mate focused on several candidates, including Mahfud MD, a former defence minister and chief justice of the Constitutional Court. In a surprise move, Jokowi announced that Ma'ruf Amin would be his running mate. Mahfud had reportedly been preparing for the vice-presidential candidacy. Ma'ruf was selected instead following a push by several constituent parties of Jokowi's governing coalition and influential Islamic figures. Explaining his decision, Jokowi referred to Ma'ruf's extensive experience in government and religious affairs.

The KPU officially announced that the Joko Widodo-Ma'ruf Amin ticket had won the election in the early hours of 21 May 2019. The official vote tally was 85 million votes for Jokowi (55.50%) and 68 million votes for Prabowo (44.50%). Supporters of Prabowo protested in Jakarta against the result, and it turned into a riot which left eight people dead and over 600 injured. Following the protests, Prabowo's campaign team launched a Constitutional Court lawsuit but was rejected in its entirety.

Presidency of Indonesia

Government and cabinets 

Despite vowing not to give government positions simply to political allies during the 2014 campaign, many members of political parties received ministerial positions in Jokowi's first cabinet. The first year of Jokowi's administration saw him controlling a minority government until Golkar, the second-largest party in the People's Representative Council (DPR), switched from opposition to the government. Jokowi denied accusations of interfering with Golkar's internal affairs, although he admitted that Luhut might have influenced the change. His cabinet's Minister of Industry Airlangga Hartarto was elected chairman of Golkar in 2018. The National Mandate Party (PAN) had also switched sides beforehand but later returned to being the opposition in 2018.

Jokowi announced the 34 names in his cabinet on 26 October 2014. While it was praised for the inclusiveness of women, with Retno Marsudi becoming Indonesia's first female foreign minister, it received criticism for several perceived political inclusions, such as Puan Maharani (daughter of Megawati Sukarnoputri). The Jokowi administration also saw the formation of two new ministries (Ministry of Public Works and Housing and Ministry of Environment and Forestry) from a merger of old ministries, in addition to renaming and reorganisation of other ministries. He conducted a total of three cabinet reshuffles until 2018, removing ministers such as Rizal Ramli and Bambang Brodjonegoro while including ministers such as Luhut and World Bank Director Sri Mulyani Indrawati. Another reshuffle occurred in December 2020, replacing six ministers including two apprehended by the KPK.

He was criticised by PDI-P over perceived policy weaknesses, and PDI-P legislator Effendi Simbolon called for his impeachment. On 9 April 2015, during a PDI-P Congress, party leader Megawati Sukarnoputri referred to Jokowi as a functionary. She noted that presidential candidates are nominated by political parties, hinting that Jokowi owed his position to the party and should carry out its policy line. Several months prior, Megawati and Jokowi had disputed over the appointment of a new police chief, with Megawati supporting her former adjutant Budi Gunawan while Jokowi supported Badrodin Haiti.

Following his re-election, Jokowi announced his second cabinet on 23 October 2019. He retained several ministers such as Sri Mulyani and Luhut but also included Gojek founder Nadiem Makarim and two-time presidential rival Prabowo Subianto as education and defence ministers, respectively.

In the first year of his second presidential term, his approval rating fell to 45.2%, and the disapproval rating was 52%. His deputy, Ma'ruf Amin, had a 67% disapproval rating. The low ratings were attributed to unpopular policies. At the start of 2023, his approval ratings had reached an all-time high of 76.2%, following easing of COVID-19 restrictions.

Economy 
Before taking office, Jokowi sought for outgoing president Susilo Bambang Yudhoyono (SBY) to take responsibility for the decision to further increase fuel prices by further removing subsidies. Previous attempts by SBY to do so had resulted in civil unrest. On 1 January 2015, Jokowi took measures that, on the surface, appeared to reduce fuel subsidies. The policy stirred up some demonstrations, with Jokowi citing it as necessary to increase funding for the infrastructure, education and health sectors. However, since March 2015, the government has set the price of Premium-branded gasoline far below the market price, causing the fuel subsidy to be incurred by state-owned oil company Pertamina instead of the direct government account. Additionally, the government also implemented a single-price program, aiming to sell fuel through official channels at the same price nationally, including in isolated parts of Kalimantan and Papua. The government claimed that this was achieved in 2017.

In the first quarter of 2015, year-on-year GDP grew 4.92%, and in the second quarter, it grew 4.6%, the lowest figure since 2009. Since then, growth has remained above the 5% mark, which is still below what is considered a healthy economic growth mark of 6%. The Indonesian rupiah (IDR) has also weakened throughout Jokowi's administration, with its exchange rate per US dollar briefly passing IDR 15,000 in 2018, the lowest level since the 1997 Asian financial crisis, and sank lower to 16,700 in 2020. The year-on-year inflation in June 2015 was 7.26%, higher than in May (7.15%) and June the year before (6.7%).

Jokowi's administration continued the resource nationalism policy of its predecessor, nationalising some assets controlled by multinational companies such as Freeport McMoRan, TotalEnergies and Chevron. In 2018, in a move aimed to cut imports, oil companies operating in Indonesia were ordered to sell their crude oil to state-owned Pertamina. A ban was also enforced on the exports of raw nickel ore, intended to help promote the development of local nickel-related industries such as smelters and battery factories. The policy was further extended, with export bans of unprocessed copper, tin, bauxite and gold ores expected to come into force in mid 2023.

Infrastructure development has been a significant feature of the Jokowi administration, focusing on road and railway expansion, seaports and airports development, and irrigation. In 2016, the state budget allocated Rp 290 trillion (US$22 billion) for infrastructure, the biggest in Indonesian history. In total, his administration planned 265 infrastructure projects starting in 2016. In September 2015, Indonesia awarded a $5.5 billion high-speed rail project to China, to Japan's disappointment, which is also vying for the project. Indonesia's transportation ministry laid out a litany of shortcomings in plans for the project, casting doubt on the project and spotlighting Jokowi's limits in turning mega-projects into reality as he tries to draw foreign investors. Other significant projects include the completion of the 4,325-kilometer Trans Papua road and the Trans-Java Toll Road, initial construction of the Trans-Sulawesi Railway and the Trans-Sumatra Toll Road, a US$50 billion plan to develop the maritime sector including 24 "strategic ports", and expansion of airport capacity in remote areas. The ports' development and modernisation program, dubbed the "Sea Toll Road" program, was aimed to reduce price inequality between the better developed western parts of the country and the less populated eastern parts.

In addition to the major projects, the Jokowi administration also implemented a village fund program in which villages across the country received funding to allocate on basic infrastructures such as roads and water supply, tourism development and village enterprises to improve rural economies. The initial campaign promise was that IDR 1.4 billion (around US$100,000) would be allocated for every village annually, though as of 2019, less than a billion was allocated. Between 2015 and 2018, IDR 187 trillion (US$14 billion) had been reallocated through the program. The administration has targeted to streamline land certification across the country, aiming to distribute certificates of land ownership across the country completely. It involved increasing the issuing rate of certificates from around 500,000 to several million annually. In 2016, the administration signed into law a tax amnesty bill following a lengthy public debate and push back, giving wealthy Indonesians a chance to declare their unreported assets before the government would strengthen rules and oversight around imports and exports. It became the most successful program of its kind in history, with over IDR 4,865 trillion (approximately US$366 billion) of previously unreported assets declared to the tax office.

The opposition criticised the aggressive spending on infrastructure as it increased Indonesia's national debt by 48% between 2014 and March 2018 to US$181 billion. They also pointed out that most of the debt was allocated for remunerations rather than infrastructure development. In April 2018, Jokowi also issued a new policy that allows foreign workers in Indonesia without Indonesian language skills requirement, reasoning that it would increase investments. The policy faced significant opposition from local labour unions, who claimed that the policy would increase unemployment rates.

In 2020, the DPR passed the Omnibus Law on Job Creation. Though intended to boost investment and reduce red tape, it is also perceived as weakening labour and environmental protections, causing a series of protests in major cities. Jokowi defended the law by saying that it would be needed to create jobs and called for protesters to lodge a challenge instead to the Constitutional Court of Indonesia. The law, which revised over 70 previous laws and contained some 1,200 clauses, had been put forward by Jokowi following his 2019 re-election. Several groups had criticised the opaqueness of the government during the deliberation of the law. In the same year, Indonesia hit the lowest inflation level in history and faced the first economic recession since the 1997 Asian Financial crisis.

In November 2021, Jokowi promised to end and reverse deforestation in Indonesia by 2030, in the COP26 climate summit's first major agreement.

Politics 

Early in his first term, the opposition coalition within the DPR attempted to revoke a regulation (Perppu, Government Regulation in Lieu of Acts) issued by Jokowi's predecessor, which had guaranteed the holding of direct regional elections in Indonesia (and overrode a legislator-issued bill which arranged for indirect elections). Jokowi supported the direct regional elections and opposed attempts to revoke the regulation, stating that "direct regional elections was, in principle, non-negotiable". Within the first three years of his administration, Jokowi issued four such Perppu.

Jokowi's government, including parties which opposed him during presidential elections, have been described as a big tent government, and by former Singaporean foreign minister George Yeo as "democracy with Javanese characteristics".

Law and human rights 

Judicial executions in Indonesia are carried out under a presidential decree following a death sentence imposed by a trial court. Jokowi in 2015 said he would not grant clemency for drug offenders sentenced to death, arguing Indonesia was in a state of emergency over drug-related crimes, citing statistics the Jakarta Globe reported to be faulty. His stance drew criticism as it could harm relations with the native countries of the condemned convicts, and also imperil Indonesians facing the death penalty abroad. Australia, Brazil and the Netherlands recalled their ambassadors from Indonesia following multiple executions in 2015. Australia reduced its foreign aid to Indonesia by nearly half, and Amnesty International issued a condemnation saying they showed a "complete disregard for due process and human rights safeguards". Former Indonesian Constitutional Court chief justice Jimly Asshiddiqie, who was a key player in the anti-death penalty lobby in Jakarta, said the push for the execution of Australians Myuran Sukumaran and Andrew Chan had come from Jokowi personally. The Sydney Morning Herald reported that Jokowi did not have or read related documents when he refused their clemency requests. In the same year, Jokowi granted Frenchman Serge Atlaoui and Filipino Mary Jane Veloso temporary reprieves due to pending legal appeals. As of 2017, around 260 people remain on death row in Indonesia.

Regarding terrorism, Jokowi's administration in early 2016 proposed replacing the 2003 anti-terrorism law. Following the 2018 Surabaya bombings, the worst terrorist attack on Indonesian soil since the 2002 Bali bombings, the controversial bill passed, allowing the Indonesian National Armed Forces to participate in counter-terrorism activities upon police request and presidential approval. It also allowed extended detention of terror suspects and permitted wiretapping without initial court approval. Jokowi had threatened to issue a presidential regulation in lieu of law (perppu) if the bill did not pass the parliament by June that year.

During Jokowi's administration, there have been numerous instances where people were arrested or reported to police for activities deemed insulting to the president. Rights activists deem such arrests as a violation of the Constitution's guarantee of freedom of speech. A group claiming to be Jokowi's supporters reported Tempo magazine to police over a caricature of Jokowi as Pinocchio, after which the Presidential Palace issued a statement saying "the President respected freedom of press and speech". A book about Jokowi titled Jokowi Undercover was banned upon release and its author sentenced to three years in prison and buyers of the book being advised to surrender their copies to the authorities. Tempo magazine described the 436-page book as "trashy and tasteless, a compilation of hoax reports on President Joko Widodo, scattered across the internet and cyber chatrooms". The government's plans to resurrect a Dutch colonial law that would permit imprisonment for insulting the president resulted in widespread protests. A Law Firm and Public Interest Law Office (AMAR) institution later reported following the protests that they received many complaints of students regarding threats and sanctions of expulsion or suspension from their schools and universities. In addition, a remission granted to a journalist's murderer was revoked following media criticism.

In response to major protests, Jokowi's administration has generated some controversies. On 22 May 2019, amid post-election riots by supporters of losing presidential candidate Prabowo Subianto, the government limited the speed at which photos and videos could be shared on social media to stop people from being incited by fake news and calls for violence. In the aftermath, Amnesty International's Indonesian office denounced repressive measures against the demonstrators, condemned them as a grave human rights abuse and demanded the government investigate the extrajudicial executions in the clashes. In August and September 2019, the government blocked internet access in Papua and West Papua provinces amid violent protests against racism. Jakarta State Administrative Court in 2020 ruled the internet blocks in Papua illegal.

In 2017, Jokowi supported a controversial bill on mass organisations, which upon passing resulted in the disbandment of the Indonesian branch of Hizb ut-Tahrir. He argued the law was necessary to defend the national ideology, Pancasila. The 2020 banning of the Islamic Defenders Front (FPI) was also based on that law. Twenty-three days' earlier, police had shot dead six FPI members during a confrontation. The president's subsequent defence of the police during their duty and his statement that no citizens should break the law or harm the country was criticised by FPI secretary-general Munarman as a justification of human rights abuse and structural violence. A police chief involved in the car chase and subsequent murder claimed that the members were armed. After the passing of several controversial bills and repressive crackdowns from security officers on major protests since 2019, his presidency has been criticised for "Neo-Authoritarianism". The South China Morning Post even named him a 'Little Suharto'

A premium price hike of public health care BPJS Kesehatan through Executive Order (Perpres) 64/2020 was criticised as a flagrant breach of permanent Supreme Court (Mahkamah Agung) decision that nullified the Perpres 82/2018 about the price hike. The Perpres 64/2020 itself was signed amid the COVID-19 pandemic that had caused hardship among the population. His former deputy mayor of Surakarta, F. X. Hadi Rudyatmo, also voiced similar concerns.

Jokowi's presidency coincided with the 50th anniversary of the Indonesian mass killings of 1965–66 in 2015. A government-supported symposium to resolve human rights violations surrounding the event was held in 2016, but Jokowi said his government would not apologise to the victims of the mass purge. On LGBT rights, Jokowi stated that "there should be no discrimination against anyone", but added that "in terms of our beliefs, [the LGBT lifestyle] isn't allowed, Islam does not allow it." Under his presidency, the controversial transmigration program was cut once more, when in 2015, it was decided to end the migration program to the Papuan provinces.

Following the July 2022 murder of Nofriansyah Yosua Hutabarat, an Indonesian police officer, there were allegations of police involvement in a cover-up. Police chief General Listyo Sigit Prabowo took over the investigation, forming a special team including members of the Human Rights Commission and Police Commissions. Jokowi was keen for the force to be open about what happens: "Open it as it is. No cover-up. Transparent. That’s it. This is important so that the people don’t have doubts over the incident that occurred. This is what has to be maintained. Public trust in the police must be maintained." In August 2022, Hutabarat's former boss, Inspector General Ferdy Sambo, head of internal affairs of the Indonesian National Police, along with three others, was charged with Hutabarat's murder.

Foreign policy 

Before Jokowi's election, Indonesia's foreign policy under former president SBY was moulded by the mission statement, "A thousand friends and zero enemies". Jokowi has mandated a three-pronged policy of maintaining Indonesia's sovereignty, enhancing the protection of Indonesian citizens, and intensifying economic diplomacy.

Jokowi aspires Indonesia to become a global maritime power ( or global maritime axis). He sees the sea as having an increasingly important role in Indonesia's future and that as a maritime country, Indonesia must assert itself as a force between the two oceans: the Indian Ocean and the Pacific Ocean. The five pillars of this maritime-axis doctrine are rebuilding Indonesia's maritime culture, maintaining and managing marine resources, developing maritime infrastructure and connectivity as well as developing the shipping industry and maritime tourism, inviting other nations to cooperate in the marine field and eliminate the source of conflicts at sea, and developing maritime defence forces. As part of this vision, Jokowi has adopted a tougher stance on illegal fishing. He stated that Jakarta could no longer tolerate a situation where over 5,000 ships are operating illegally in its waters every day, making a mockery out of Indonesian sovereignty and resulting in annual losses of over $20 billion.

On the territorial disputes in the South China Sea, particularly in the Natuna Islands where China's nine-dash line intercepts Indonesian EEZ claims, Jokowi stated that "there will be no compromise on sovereignty", and renamed Indonesia's section of the waters in the South China Sea as "North Natuna Sea". In June 2016, he held a cabinet meeting off the islands aboard the Indonesian Navy corvette KRI Imam Bonjol, calling to step up maritime patrols in the area. Under his administration, Indonesia has released an "Indo-Pacific Vision" for ASEAN countries, which calls for regional architecture and considers the Indian and Pacific Oceans as a single interconnected geostrategic area. Indonesia also entered a trilateral cooperation agreement with Malaysia and the Philippines, allowing coordinated patrols in the pirate-infested Sulu Sea.

In the Muslim world, Jokowi released a statement calling for the Muslim leaders at the Organisation of Islamic Cooperation summit meeting in Jakarta to unite in reconciliation and push for Palestinian independence. Under Jokowi, Indonesia's Foreign Minister has visited Palestine but refused entreaties to establish bilateral diplomatic relations with Israel. An honorary consul was established in Ramallah in the West Bank though it had to be inaugurated in Amman, Jordan. Jokowi also condemned the persecution of Rohingya Muslims in Myanmar and oversaw the departure of four Indonesian Air Force transport planes with 34 tons of relief supplies for Rohingya refugees in Bangladesh. In October 2021, Jokowi advocated COVID-19 vaccine equity, urging richer countries to share their vaccines with poorer ones.

Responding to the 2022 Russian invasion of Ukraine, Jokowi visited both countries in July 2022, meeting with both Ukrainian President Volodymyr Zelenskyy and Russian President Vladimir Putin, emphasizing in statements the need for peace and for the restoration of global food supply chains. As Indonesia hosted the 2022 G20 Summit that year, Jokowi also invited Zelenskyy to attend, while resisting calls to revoke Russia's invitation to the summit.

Capital relocation 
By April 2019, it was made public that Jokowi had decided in a meeting with cabinet ministers to move the capital of Indonesia away from Jakarta to a location outside Java. On 25 August 2019, it was further announced that the new capital would be located in Kalimantan, between the regencies of North Penajam Paser and Kutai Kartanegara.

Jokowi Effect
The Jokowi Effect is a term coined to describe the influence of media popularity of Jokowi on Indonesian politics and the Indonesian economy. When Jokowi was declared as a presidential candidate in the 2014 Indonesian presidential election it is believed that the popularity of the Indonesian Democratic Party – Struggle was boosted to 30% in the 2014 Indonesian legislative election. Meanwhile, in the capital market, the effect is said to have stimulated the Indonesian stock market and Rupiah, because Jokowi was regarded as having a clean track record.

Family and personal life 

Jokowi married his wife Iriana in 1986. The couple has two sons and one daughter. Their first son, Gibran Rakabuming Raka (born 1 October 1987), studied abroad in Sydney and Singapore (at the Management Development Institute of Singapore, MDIS) and currently runs a catering and wedding-planning business in Surakarta. Their only daughter, Kahiyang Ayu (born 20 April 1991), completed an undergraduate degree in food technology at the state-owned Sebelas Maret University in Surakarta. Their second son, Kaesang Pangarep (born 25 December 1994), completed his high school years in ACS International, Singapore, and is an online vlogger. Jokowi has five grandchildren: a grandson and a granddaughter from Gibran (born in 2016 and 2019 respectively) and a granddaughter and two grandsons from Kahiyang (born in 2018, 2020 and 2022 respectively).

Several members of Jokowi's family have declared their intentions to enter politics by running as candidates in 2020 local elections. Gibran has declared his candidacy for the mayorship of Surakarta, in addition to his son-in-law Bobby Nasution (Medan) and brother-in-law Wahyu Purwanto (Gunung Kidul Regency). Gibran and Bobby won their elections, and both took office in 2021.

Jokowi has been described as "Muslim but broadly secular in his outlook". His statement in 2019 that religion and politics should be separated prompted a public debate on whether he was promoting secularism in the country. In June 2013, a film titled Jokowi, depicting Jokowi's childhood and youth, was released. He expressed some objections to the film, saying that he felt his life had been a simple one and was not worthy of being adapted into a film.

According to The Economist, Jokowi "has a penchant for loud rock music" and owned a bass guitar signed by Robert Trujillo of heavy metal band Metallica which was confiscated by the KPK. In November 2017, Danish Prime Minister Lars Løkke Rasmussen, who was on an official visit to Jakarta, gave Jokowi a Metallica Master of Puppets vinyl box set as a diplomatic gift. It was signed by the band's drummer and co-founder, Lars Ulrich, a Danish native. Under his policy of transparency, Jokowi paid IDR 11 million ($800) out of his personal funds to claim the record, which had been declared a state asset to avoid accusations of gratification. He is also a fan of other metal bands including Lamb of God, Carcass and Napalm Death. On 2 November 2013, while he was the Governor of Jakarta, he was seen in the rock festival Rock in Solo in casual dress. 

He has also been noted by many to be very similar in appearance to former US president Barack Obama; his outsider political profile also inspired comparisons to Obama.

Jokowi is a silat practitioner. He had been practicing Setia Hati Terate style from Persaudaraan Setia Hati Terate school since his time at junior high school and eventually mastering it. He attained first degree pendekar warga rank of the silat school on 16 November 2013.

Awards and honours

National honours 
  Star of the Republic of Indonesia, 1st Class – 2014
  Star of Mahaputera, 1st Class – 2014
  Star of Merit, 1st Class – 2011
  Star of Humanity – 2014
  Star of Democracy Upholder, 1st Class – 2014
  Star of Culture Parama Dharma – 2014
  Star of Bhayangkara, 1st Class – 2014
  Guerilla Star – 2014
  Sacred Star – 2014
  Star of Dharma – 2014
  Star of Yudha Dharma, 1st Class – 2014
  Star of Kartika Eka Paksi, 1st Class – 2014
  Star of Jalasena, 1st Class – 2014
  Star of Swa Bhuwana Paksa, 1st Class – 2014

Foreign honours 
  Brunei
  The Most Esteemed Family Order of Brunei (DK) – 7 February 2015
  Sultan of Brunei Golden Jubilee Medal – 6 October 2017
  Saudi Arabia
  Order of Abdulaziz al Saud – 12 September 2015
  East Timor
  Great-collar of the Order of Timor-Leste – 26 January 2016
  Sweden
  Knight of the Royal Order of the Seraphim – 22 May 2017
  Afghanistan
  Medal of Ghazi Amanullah – 29 January 2018

Other 
2008: Listed by Tempo as one of the 'Top 10 Indonesian Mayors of 2008'.

2012: Ranked 3rd at the 2012 World Mayor Prize for "transforming a crime-ridden city into a regional centre for art and culture and an attractive city to tourists".

2013: Listed as one of "The Leading Global Thinkers of 2013" in Foreign Policy magazine. In February 2013, he was nominated as the global mayor of the month by the City Mayors Foundation, based in London.

2014: Listed by Fortune as one of "The World's 50 Greatest Leaders".

2016–2017: List by "The Muslim 500" as one of the most influential Muslims in the world, which ranked 11 in 2016 and 13 in 2017.

2020: Sheikh Khalid bin Mohammed bin Zayed Al Nahyan renamed a street in Abu Dhabi, United Arab Emirates after him.

References

Further reading 
 Majeed, Rushda (2012). "The City With a Short Fuse." Foreign Policy. September.
 Majeed, Rushda (2012). "Defusing a Volatile City, Igniting Reforms: Joko Widodo and Surakarta, Indonesia, 2005–2011." Innovations for Successful Societies. Princeton University. Published July.
 McCawley, Peter (2014). Joko Widodo's Indonesia: Possible future paths, Australian Strategic Policy Institute, Canberra.

External links 

 The ‘Jokowi Effect’ Could Be the Most Important Thing in Indonesia’s Elections
 The key to understanding Indonesia’s upcoming elections? The Jokowi Effect

|-

|-

|-

|-

 
1961 births
Gadjah Mada University alumni
Governors of Jakarta
Indonesian businesspeople
Indonesian Democratic Party of Struggle politicians
Indonesian engineers
Indonesian Muslims
Javanese people
Living people
Mayors of Surakarta
People from Surakarta
Presidents of Indonesia
Mayors of places in Indonesia